Mentzer Building is a historic commercial building located at Ephrata, Lancaster County, Pennsylvania. It was built in 1889, and is a three-story, brick building in the Queen Anne style.  The building has housed school classrooms, barbershops, an electric supply store, meeting rooms, and retail clothing sales shops.  The porch and entrance have been restored based on historical photographs.

It was listed on the National Register of Historic Places in 1985.  It is located in the Ephrata Commercial Historic District.

References

Commercial buildings on the National Register of Historic Places in Pennsylvania
Queen Anne architecture in Pennsylvania
Commercial buildings completed in 1889
Buildings and structures in Lancaster County, Pennsylvania
National Register of Historic Places in Lancaster County, Pennsylvania
Individually listed contributing properties to historic districts on the National Register in Pennsylvania